Chauveau is a French surname. Notable people with the surname include:

Alexandre Chauveau (1847–1916), lawyer, judge and educator
Auguste Chauveau (1827–1917), professor and veterinarian
Claude François Chauveau-Lagarde (1756–1841), lawyer in Paris
Claude Chauveau (1861-1940), French politician
François Chauveau (1613–1676), French engraver
Jean-Pierre Chauveau (born 1942), a member of the Senate of France
Michel Chauveau (born 1956), French historian and Egyptologist
Pierre-Joseph-Olivier Chauveau (1820–1890), the first premier of the Canadian province of Quebec 
Sylvain Chauveau (born 1971), an instrumental music and electronic music artist and composer from Bayonne, France
Yves Chauveau (born 1945), a French retired professional football goalkeeper

See also
Chauveau (electoral district)
Chauveau Point
Pierre Chauveau Medal

French-language surnames